Maja Greta Magnusson (8 March 1929 – 16 January 1998) was a Swedish athlete. She competed at the 1952 Summer Olympics in the long jump and 4 × 100 m relay, but failed to reach the finals. She finished fifth-seventh in these events at the 1946 European Athletics Championships. Magnusson won the national long jump title in 1947, 1949, 1952 and 1956.

References

1929 births
1998 deaths
Swedish female sprinters
Olympic athletes of Sweden
Athletes (track and field) at the 1952 Summer Olympics
Olympic female sprinters
People from Vänersborg Municipality
Sportspeople from Västra Götaland County